M. pentaphylla may refer to:

 Manihot pentaphylla, a milkspurge native to the Americas
 Mollugo pentaphylla, a herbaceous plant